Ingerlise Rosita Jensen (born  in Copenhagen) is a Danish wheelchair curler.

She participated in the 2006 Winter Paralympics where Danish team finished on fifth place.

Teams

References

External links 

Living people
1951 births
Sportspeople from Copenhagen
Danish female curlers
Danish wheelchair curlers
Paralympic wheelchair curlers of Denmark
Wheelchair curlers at the 2006 Winter Paralympics